Rodnikovsky (masculine), Rodnikovskaya (feminine), or Rodnikovskoye (neuter) is the name of several rural localities in Russia.

Modern localities
Rodnikovsky, Karachay-Cherkess Republic, a khutor in Prikubansky District of the Karachay-Cherkess Republic
Rodnikovsky, Krasnodar Krai, a khutor in Sovetsky Rural Okrug of Novokubansky District of Krasnodar Krai
Rodnikovsky, Penza Oblast, a settlement under the administrative jurisdiction of  the Work Settlement of Kolyshley in Kolyshleysky District of Penza Oblast
Rodnikovsky, Stavropol Krai, a khutor in Ust-Nevinsky Selsoviet of Kochubeyevsky District of Stavropol Krai
Rodnikovsky, Nekhayevsky District, Volgograd Oblast, a khutor in Zakhopersky Selsoviet of Nekhayevsky District of Volgograd Oblast
Rodnikovsky, Novoanninsky District, Volgograd Oblast, a khutor in Staroanninsky Selsoviet of Novoanninsky District of Volgograd Oblast
Rodnikovskoye, a selo in Arzgirsky District of Stavropol Krai
Rodnikovskaya, a stanitsa in Rodnikovsky Rural Okrug of Kurganinsky District of Krasnodar Krai

Alternative names
Rodnikovsky, alternative name of Rodnikovy, a settlement under the administrative jurisdiction of Maykop Republican Urban Okrug in the Republic of Adygea